Vernier Software & Technology is an educational software company located in Beaverton, Oregon, that produces technology used for scientific education.

Vernier is one of the first companies to popularize the use of computers and sensor technology, known as "probeware" or "Microcomputer Based Labs" (MBL), during laboratory experiments.

History
Vernier Software & Technology was founded in 1981 in Portland, Oregon, at the home of David Vernier, a high-school physics teacher, and Christine Vernier, a local business manager.

The first software programs developed by David Vernier were scientific simulations for Apple II computers. In 1982, David developed the program Graphical Analysis, which allowed an individual to manually enter data into a table and display the data as a graph. That year, the company started producing data-acquisition software and providing instructions for individuals to build their own sensors. Gradually, the company expanded the product line to include software for other computers using the DOS operating system and for Macintosh computers.

In the late 1980s, the company started producing assembled temperature sensors and many other types of sensors, such as photogates and motion detectors for studying moving objects. In 1990, the Universal Lab Interface (ULI), the MultiPurpose Lab Interface (MPLI), and software to run on Macintosh and Windows computers were introduced, quickly followed by the introduction of the Serial Box Interface.

In 1994, Vernier began a collaboration with Texas Instruments to support data collection on graphing calculators after Texas Instruments introduced the Calculator-Based Laboratory (CBL). In 1996, Vernier developed Logger Pro, a general-purpose data collection and analysis computer program, which after many revisions is now called Logger Pro 3.

Current products
Vernier Software & Technology exports products to over 120 countries through Vernier International, based in Sarasota, Florida. The company produces 75 sensors and six data-collection interfaces.

Logger Pro 3 software collects and analyzes data from Vernier interfaces, plus
Electronic balances from Ohaus
GPS from Garmin
Spectrometers from Ocean Optics
Gas chromatographs developed in collaboration with Seacoast Science

Other strategic partnerships for STEM education include the development of an adapter with Lego Education that allows sensors to be used with Lego Mindstorms NXT; and SensorDAQ, a sensor interface developed with National Instruments that may be used with LabVIEW.

Company
The company is located in a LEED gold-certified building and employs approximately 100 individuals. David Vernier serves as CEO of Vernier Software & Technology and oversees product development, and Christine Vernier serves as COO and oversees company operations.

United States President Barack Obama, then a presidential candidate, visited the company in May 2008.

The company has won many awards, including Fastest-Growing Private Company in Oregon from the Portland Business Journal, 100 Best Places to Work in Oregon from the Oregon Business Magazine for the last 11 straight years, and Best Green Companies in Oregon.

Vernier Software & Technology has been engaged in many philanthropic endeavors, including the funding of the Vernier Technology Laboratory at the Oregon Museum of Science and Industry and many other educational, environmental, and social service organizations.

The Vernier Technology Awards are presented every year to seven teachers at the National Science Teachers Association convention.

In August 2022, Vernier Software & Technology announced the organization had changed its name to Vernier Science Education. The organization stated that the change is to reflect the organization's mission of "building a STEM-literate society".

References

External links
 Vernier Software & Technology website — homepage.
 Oregon Business
 Association of Fundraising Professionals
 U.S. Green Building Council
 National Science Teachers Association
 Vernier to invest $2.8 million under Beaverton Enterprise Zone program - The Oregonian

Educational technology companies of the United States
Educational software companies
Companies based in Beaverton, Oregon
Software companies established in 1981
1981 establishments in Oregon